The Corridor is one of the world's earliest retail  arcades, designed by architect Henry Goodridge and built in 1825, in Bath, Somerset, England.

The fashion for arranging shops in arcades arose in Paris in the late 18th Century. The Corridor followed the trend set by London's Burlington Arcade.

The Grade II listed arcade has a glass roof. The High Street end has a Doric colonnade. Each end has marble columns.

A musicians gallery, with a wrought iron balustrade and gilt lions heads and garlands, is in the centre of the arcade.

Number 7 was the photographic studio of William Friese-Greene.

Bombing
On 9 December 1974, a telephone warning alerted police in Bath that a bomb was shortly to explode in the Corridor. The subsequent blast at 9.10pm from a 5 lb bomb planted by the Irish Republican Army caused huge damage and forced the Corridor to undergo a major renovation programme. No one was hurt in the blast.

References

Commercial buildings completed in 1825
Shopping malls established in 1825
Grade II listed buildings in Bath, Somerset
Buildings and structures in Bath, Somerset
Shopping centres in Bath and North East Somerset
Shopping arcades in England